The Claridge Icon is a 45-storey condominium tower under construction in Ottawa, Ontario, Canada. It is located at the intersection of Carling Avenue and Preston Street in Little Italy. When the structure topped out in 2019, it became the tallest building in Ottawa since 1971 and the tallest in Ottawa-Gatineau since 1978.

The building was designed by Hariri Pontarini Architects and built by Claridge Homes. It has suffered lengthy delays. When first announced in 2012, Claridge aimed for opening in late 2016. Once construction had begun in 2015, it was planned to be ready for occupancy in 2018.

Early during construction in March 2016, a worker was struck and killed by a  chunk of ice that fell from the side of the construction pit. This resulted in a year-long delay and charges against the developer and main contractor (which were fined $325,000 each in May 2019). Construction work was halted again in March 2018 when a worker fell  from a platform and suffered a head injury.

See also
 List of tallest buildings in Ottawa–Gatineau
 Architecture of Ottawa

References

External links

Skyscrapers in Ottawa
Residential skyscrapers in Canada